Rear Admiral James Ashton DSO (1883–1951) was a senior Royal Navy officer.

Naval career
Born in 1883, James Ashton was educated at Bedford School and at the Royal Naval Engineering College, Devonport. He served in the Royal Navy during the First World War and was invested as a Companion of the Distinguished Service Order in 1917. He was appointed as Aide-de-camp to King Edward VIII in 1936, and served at the Admiralty during the Second World War.

Rear Admiral James Ashton died on 30 December 1951, aged 68.

References

1883 births
1951 deaths
People educated at Bedford School
Royal Navy rear admirals
Royal Navy officers of World War I
Royal Navy officers of World War II
Companions of the Distinguished Service Order